Farragut State Park is a public recreation area located at the southern tip of Lake Pend Oreille in the Coeur d'Alene Mountains of the Idaho Panhandle in the northwest United States. Activities include camping, picnicking, hiking, mountain biking, cycling, fishing, boating, swimming, water sports, orienteering, disc golf, flying model aircraft, archery, and horseback riding.

History
Naval training base

The park grounds were formerly the Farragut Naval Training Station, a major training base of the U.S. Navy during World War II. Over 293,000 sailors received basic training at Farragut during its 30 months of existence. The last recruit graduated in March 1945 and the facility was decommissioned in 

State park
In 1950, the federal government transferred  of the former Farragut Naval Training Center to the Idaho Department of Fish and Game, creating the Farragut Wildlife Management Area. In 1964, the department transferred  back to the federal government, which then deeded the land to the Idaho Department of Parks and Recreation. That acreage became Farragut State Park by an act of the Idaho Legislature in 1966.

Scouting
Farragut State Park is significant in the history of Scouting in Idaho.  It hosted the National Girl Scout Senior Roundup in 1965, the World Scout Jamboree in 1967, the National Scout Jamboree in 1969 and 1973, and the 2002 Star Northwest of the Boy Scouts of America. The world event in 1967 was the only time the event has been held in the United States until 2019. While traveling to the moon aboard Apollo 11 on July 18, 1969, astronaut Neil Armstrong extended a greeting to the Scouts attending the national jamboree in Idaho. Armstrong was an Eagle Scout from Ohio. Frank Borman, astronaut and commander of Apollo 8, addressed the Scouts, as did Lady Baden-Powell, the widow of Scouting's founder. At the Jamboree in 1973, Admiral Elmo Zumwalt, Chief of Naval Operations, and Gene Cernan, astronaut and commander of Apollo 17, addressed the Scouts.

Wildlife
The residential animals of this state park are bass, trout, white-tailed deer, moose, elk and mountain goat. Cougar and Black Bear

Activities and amenities
The park offers traditional recreational opportunities such as picnicking, boating, swimming, hiking, and camping, as well as disc golf, a model airplane flying field, the Naval Training Center and a museum. A remaining military feature is the Museum at the Brig, located in the confinement facility of the naval training station. Its displays include boot camp, naval, and war memorabilia as well as historic prison cells.

See also
 List of Idaho state parks
 National Parks in Idaho

References

External links 
Farragut State Park Idaho Parks and Recreation
Farragut State Park Trail Guide Idaho Parks and Recreation
Museum at the Brig at Farragut State Park Idaho Department of Commerce - Tourism Development

State parks of Idaho
Protected areas of Kootenai County, Idaho
Protected areas established in 1966
Buildings and structures in Kootenai County, Idaho
Museums in Kootenai County, Idaho
Military and war museums in Idaho
Boy Scouts of America
Girl Scouts of the USA
Prison museums in Idaho